Bahadir II Gerai (Girey) (Crimean. Bahadır Geray 1722–1791, ٢ بهادر كراى ;) - Crimean Khan, who came to power during the uprising of 1782. The eldest son of Tsarevich Akhmed Geray (d. 1750) and the grandson of the Crimean Khan Devlet II Geray .

Life 

In 1777, Prince Bahadir Gerai became the leader of the Abaza people. In 1781, he was appointed and approved by his brother, the Crimean Khan Şahin Giray, serasker of the Edichkul horde. Ruling since 1777, Khan Shahin Gerai carried out pro-Russian radical reforms in Crimea, in particular, equalizing Muslim and non-Muslim populations. Reforms were extremely unpopular, and in 1781 led to an uprising that began in the Kuban and quickly spread to the Crimea. By July 1782, an uprising completely swept the entire peninsula, the khan was forced to flee, and his administration officials, who had not managed to escape, were killed. At the center of the uprising were the brothers Shakhin, princes Bahadir Gerai and Arslan Gerai . Bahadir Gerai was elected khan and is considered the last independent Crimean khan, since the short reign of Shakhin after him was a puppet character. Bahadir Gerai appointed his younger brother Arslan Gerai as a kalga-sultan.

The new Crimean government applied for recognition to the Ottoman and Russian empires. The first refused to recognize the new khan, and the second sent troops to crush the uprising. The troops were commanded in the Crimea by Anton Bogdanovich Balmen, and in the Kuban by Alexander Vasilievich Suvorov. By November 1782, the uprising was completely crushed, most of Bahadir's supporters through the North Caucasus went to Turkey, and Bahadir himself was captured and was imprisoned in Kherson. In 1783, he managed to escape to the Caucasus, and since 1789 he lived in Turkey. He died in Turkey on his estate in 1791 near Istanbul.

Sources 
 Gaivoronsky Alex. Constellation Geraev. - Simferopol, 2003
 Vladimir Gutakov, “Russian Way to the South” 

1722 births
1791 deaths
Crimean Khans
18th-century rulers in Europe